The men's sanda (as Sanshou) 56 kg at the 2006 Asian Games in Doha, Qatar was held from 11 to 14 December at the Aspire Hall 3 in Aspire Zone.

A total of fourteen competitors from fourteen countries competed in this event, which is limited to fighters whose body weight was less than 56 kilograms.

Li Teng from China won the gold medal after his opponent Phoxay Aphailath of Laos did not show up for the gold medal bout and lost the final by default.

Kim Jun-yul of South Korea and Jalil Ataei from Iran won the bronze medal.

Schedule
All times are Arabia Standard Time (UTC+03:00)

Results
Legend
WO — Won by walkover

References

Results

External links
Official website

Men's sanda 56 kg